Paul Freeman may refer to:

Paul Freeman (actor) (born 1943), British actor
Paul Freeman (communist) (died 1921), communist
Paul Freeman (conductor) (1936–2015), American conductor
Paul Freeman (cryptozoologist) (1943–2003), American Bigfoot hunter
Paul Freeman (songwriter), Welsh-born singer-songwriter
Paul L. Freeman Jr. (1907–1988), United States Army general

See also
 Paul Friedman (disambiguation)